Khirbet Beit Lei or Beth Loya is an archaeological tell in the Judean lowlands of Israel. It is located about 5.5 km southeast of Tel Lachish and ten miles west-northwest of Hebron, on a hill 400 m above sea level.                                                              

An Iron Age II burial cave was discovered to contain an inscription with one of the oldest known appearances in Hebrew of the name "Jerusalem".

Archaeology

Surveys
Khirbet Beit Lei was first surveyed by R.A.S. Macalister of the Palestine Exploration Fund, who found a rock-cut chapel and burial caves (published 1901).

Between 1972 and 1973, the site was surveyed by Yehuda Dagan. During this survey, no Iron Age remains were found. The survey further revealed that the site had been settled from the Hellenistic period until at least the Mamluk period. A number of hewn subterranean installations, including columbaria, olive presses, water cisterns, quarries, a stable and hideaways are attributed to the Hellenistic and Roman periods.

Two Iron Age II burial caves
During the construction of a road in 1961, an ancient burial complex was discovered in the eastern part of the site. An archaeological expedition by the Israel Antiquities Authority led by Joseph Naveh (1928-2011) of the Hebrew University of Jerusalem found two Iron Age II multi-chamber burial caves. One cave consisted of three chambers cut into the chalky limestone. Eight skeletons lay on limestone ledges around the sides of the chambers, untouched since being laid to rest. A ring, a bronze earring and a bronze plaque were also found in the cave, which contained carved drawings and inscriptions. Three of the drawings were of human figures: a man holding what might be a lyre, a man raising his arms, possibly in a prayer gesture, and a man wearing a headdress. Two sailing vessels were sketched on another wall. Two other figures may be an encampment and a tent. The ships lead scholars to believe that the chambers were reused by Israelite refugees fleeing the Chaldaean armies in the sixth century BCE, probably Levites. Ships are a common motif in ancient Near Eastern burial chambers. The other cave had been looted at some point, and analysis revealed that the interred individuals belonged to a group of different origin than the first group.

Ancient Hebrew inscriptions, known as the Khirbet Beit Lei graffiti, were found in the caves.

1979-1983 caves investigation
From 1979 to 1983, Yotam Tepper and Y. Shahar  the caves at the site.

Byzantine basilica and nearby structures
In 1983 and 1986 Joseph Patrich and Yoram Tsafrir excavated a basilica church at the site, as well as an olive press, a wine press and a burial cave nearby, on behalf of the Institute of Archaeology of the Hebrew University in Jerusalem. The church is thought to have been built around the year 500 CE, and to have functioned well into the 8th century. The church complex was thought to be on the outskirts of a village. The mosaic floors of the church were defaced, reflecting iconoclastic activity, but were then repaired.

2005 excavations
The excavations at the site were renewed in 2005 under the direction of the Oren Gutfeld, on behalf of the Institute of Archaeology of the Hebrew University in Jerusalem, with funding from a Mormon non-profit foundation.

References

Further reading
 (p. 274)

 (p. 365)
 Suder, Robert W.: Hebrew inscriptions: a classified bibliography

External links
Survey of Western Palestine, Map 20:   IAA, Wikimedia commons (named Beit Leyi; N of Al-Dawayima)

Ancient Israel and Judah
Archaeological sites in Israel
Buildings and structures in Southern District (Israel)